XLT Agar (Xylose Lysine Tergitol-4) is a selective culture medium for the isolation and identification of salmonellae from food and environmental samples. It is similar to XLD agar; however, the agar is supplemented with the surfactant, Tergitol 4, which causes inhibition of Proteus spp. and other non-Salmonellae.
Successful growth of Salmonella will result in growth of red colonies with a black centre.
XLT Agar contains:

See also
Agar plate
XLD agar
R2a agar
MRS agar

References

External links
 EU fines price-fixing citric acid cartel

Microbiological media